The John A. Hartford Foundation (JAHF or the Hartford Foundation) is a private United States-based philanthropy whose current mission is to improve the care of older adults. For many years, it made grants for research and education in geriatric medicine, nursing and social work. It now focuses on three priority areas: creating age-friendly health systems, supporting family caregivers and improving serious illness, and end-of-life care.

History 
Based in New York City, the foundation was founded in 1929 by John Augustine Hartford and later joined by his brother George Ludlum Hartford, the family owners of the A&P grocery chain. The foundation's mission from the beginning has been "to do the greatest good for the greatest number."

In the early and mid-20th century, the foundation primarily made grants for research centered on basic and clinical medicine and health care quality and costs. It was at one time the largest funder in these areas. In 1982, the focus turned towards improving the care of older adults, as there became an increasing need to fund this underserved area. In 1994, the foundation made this priority its chief mission.

Leadership 

Terry Fulmer, PhD, RN, FAAN, is the President of the foundation. She serves as the chief strategist for the foundation, and her vision for better care of older adults is influencing the Age-Friendly Health Systems social movement.

She is an elected member of the National Academy of Medicine and recently served on the independent Coronavirus Commission for Safety and Quality in Nursing Homes established to advise the Centers for Medicare and Medicaid Services. She previously served as Distinguished Professor and Dean of Health Sciences at Northeastern University. Prior, she served as the Erline Perkins McGriff Professor and Founding Dean of the New York University College of Nursing. She has held faculty appointments at Columbia University, where she was the Anna C. Maxwell Chair in Nursing, and she has also held appointments at Boston College, Yale University, and the Harvard Division on Aging at Harvard Medical School. She is a Distinguished Practitioner of the National Academies of Practice and is currently an attending nurse and senior nurse in the Yvonne L. Munn Center for Nursing Research at the Massachusetts General Hospital and an attending nurse at Mount Sinai Medical Center in NYC. Her clinical appointments have included the Beth Israel Hospital in Boston, the Massachusetts General Hospital, and the NYU Langone Medical Center. She is a Fellow of the American Academy of Nursing, the Gerontological Society of America, and the New York Academy of Medicine where she served as vice-chair. She has authored nearly 400 peer-reviewed papers.

Priority areas  
In a rapidly evolving health care environment, the Foundation supports the spread of evidence-based models that can dramatically accelerate care improvement for older adults, which benefits all of us. The three priority areas are: Age-Friendly Health Systems; Family Caregiving, and Serious Illness & End of Life.

Age-friendly health systems 

To prevent harm to older adults, improve health outcomes, and lower overall costs, health systems must adopt evidence-based models and practices that deliver better care to our rapidly aging population across all settings, including the home and community. In partnership with expert innovators and health care leaders, The John A. Hartford Foundation is working to create health systems that are age-friendly and better able to meet the goals of the Triple Aim.

Family caregiving 

There are nearly 18 million people in the US regularly providing care to an older loved one who needs assistance. These family caregivers frequently perform heroic tasks, but are often invisible in our health care system and receive little preparation and support.

Recognizing the critical role that family caregivers play, The John A. Hartford Foundation is committed to transforming our health care and social services systems to meet the needs of family caregivers.

Serious illness and end of life 

With increasing age comes greater risk for serious illness and the natural progression towards the end of life. Too often, care at this time fails to meet the goals and preferences of older adults and results in harm and burden. Palliative care and other effective approaches must be more widely available.

The John A. Hartford Foundation will continue to promote care that preserves dignity and honors the wishes of older adults and their families.

Activities 

From about 1980 to 2012, the foundation focused on a two-pronged effort to build training capacity and conduct research into different models of care for older adults at schools of medicine, nursing, and social work. Its current programs aim to more directly impact the health of older adults. In 2013, the Foundation organized its grantmaking in five portfolios: Interprofessional Leadership in Action, Linking Education and Practice, Developing and Disseminating Models of Care, Tools and Measures for Quality Care, and Policy and Communications. In 2015 and 2016,  the foundation implemented its current priority areas: creating age-friendly health systems, supporting family caregivers, and improving serious illness and end-of-life care. In 2016, the Age-Friendly Health System initiative was started in collaboration with the Institute for Healthcare Improvement (IHI), American Hospital Association (AHA), and the Catholic Health Association of the United States (CHA).

In 2008, the foundation led a consortium of grantmakers to fund a study from the Institute of Medicine to look at the "crisis" of an ill-prepared workforce and outdated models of caring for older adults."

Geriatric training  
In order to grow the geriatric workforce, JAHF has helped to develop training programs across various disciplines, from university-based physicians to nurses and social workers. The hope has been to establish a strong interdisciplinary labor force that is well-trained clinically and well-equipped academically to further geriatric research and care.

Medicine 
One of the largest and most important programs in the foundation's recent history has been to help build academic capacity in geriatric medicine through the Centers of Excellence in Geriatric Medicine, which started in 1986. They are located at academic medical centers around the country, and are known as high-throughput producers of academic geriatricians as well as the generators of basic, clinical, and population level medical knowledge about older adults. As many as 55,000 physicians are trained or mentored at these centers annually.

The Paul Beeson Physician Faculty Scholars in Aging Research Program was launched in 1994, in partnership with Atlantic Philanthropies, the Commonwealth Fund, and the Starr Foundation. As of 2019, the three-year fellowship has trained 225 scholars, with significant impacts to aging research. 

The foundation has also supported training and development programs for medical students, fellows, junior faculty, and senior thought leaders through its funding of the Association of American Medical Colleges for geriatric scholarships, residence programs, and curriculum development. Another important initiative has been building bridges from geriatric medicine out to the subspecialties of internal medicine and surgical and related specialties.

Nursing
Geriatric nursing has long been an important focus of JAHF, and this culminated in $5 million of funding to establish the John A. Hartford Foundation Institute for the Advancement of Geriatric Nursing in 1996, the first of its kind in the US. From supporting nursing societies to the American Association of Colleges of Nursing, the institute helped to build curriculums and experiences to expose nursing students to geriatrics in their programs. 

To further the academic training of nurses, five centers of geriatric nursing excellence were established – 300 trainees had received pre- and postdoctoral fellowships through 2015, and as of 2012, 95% were part of nursing school faculties.

Social work 
The foundation focused on enhancing the capability of schools of social work to train aging-competent social workers through the Geriatric Social Work Initiative in the late 1990s. There were three core goals for the initiative: (1) work with the Council on Social Work Education to incorporate geriatrics into the curriculum; (2) offer scholarships and fellowships to faculty and students to fund their pursuits in geriatric social work; and (3) provide practical exposure by placing upper-level social work students in field experiences.

Care models

Community-based care 
Programs of All-Inclusive Care for the Elderly (PACE) has long been championed by JAHF. Providing services for approximately 40,000 people, the model allows persons older than fifty-five to receive health and social services in their homes, instead of resorting to long-term care facilities. Despite being reimbursed by Medicare and Medicaid, PACE still only covers a small portion of those who are eligible.

Team Care 

Separate from the foundation’s support of geriatric training, there were multiple studies done on promoting the interdisciplinary nature of care teams. Beyond just physicians and nurses, these teams also included social workers and others, and were especially effective for managing those with complex conditions and multiple comorbidities.

Hospital and home care 
 
For some older adults with serious illness, the preferred place of treatment is their home. The Hospital at Home program allows this option for conditions such as congestive heart failure. The foundation has also invested in other innovative delivery models, such as Acute Care of the Elderly (ACE), which focuses on structuring age-appropriate hospital rooms, and Nurses Improving Care for Healthsystem Elders (NICHE), a framework for age-friendly nursing care in hospitals and other healthcare settings.

Palliative care 
Originating in 2006, JAHF’s support of the Center for Palliative Care at Mount Sinai Medical Center has been one of its most significant projects. Despite difficulty in securing Medicare reimbursement, palliative care has expanded significantly, with almost 75% of all hospitals offering it in some capacity.

Leadership and policy 

JAHF has avidly supported thought leaders in policy, from funding National Health Policy Forum seminars to investing in various reports by the National Academies. The foundation continues to engage in the policy sphere through its various partnerships with government agencies.

Special grants 
The foundation has made rare special grants, including grants in response to the 911 terrorist events, and Hurricanes Katrina and Rita. The grants have often focused on better disaster preparation and relief policies for institutionalized older adults.

Grantee communication 
Beginning in 2006, the foundation has made efforts to communicate with its grantees and other stakeholders, sponsoring grantee perception surveys by the Center for Effective Philanthropy and released in part to the public. (A 2010 Grantee Perception Report is not currently publicly available.) It has circulated an e-newsletter to its stakeholder community since at least 2004, and has launched an online blog, Health AGEnda.

Impact 
When JAHF entered the space of aging and health, there were very few funders, and often with limited scope. The Veterans Health Administration and the Bureau of Health Professions were the only ones involved in geriatrician training. The Gerontological Society of American and the American Geriatrics Society, both created in the 1940s, helped to finance research and clinical work in aging. And in 1974, the National Institute of Aging was established, also with the primary intent to fund clinical research.  

At that time (late 1970s), there were less than 750 geriatricians in the entire United States. Since then, JAHF has helped make tremendous progress, with more than 7,000 geriatricians certified by 2010 and geriatrics integrated into almost all medical curricula and board certification requirements across the country. Geriatrics exposure has also significantly changed in nursing education, with 90% of bachelor’s-level nursing programs incorporating geriatrics into their required coursework by 2003. This training is not just limited to physicians and nurses, JAHF has sought to bring geriatrics into the professional education of all health workers on some level.  

Through its funding of work on care models, the foundation has helped to foster various experiential care delivery methods that show promise clinically and economically. As more evidence proves the effectiveness of these models, the spotlight is now on the policy work needed to secure reimbursements and scale up these programs.

Governance 
The foundation, like most large U.S. charitable foundations, has no set closure date. 
 
Although not directly related by mission or program activities, in 1983 the Hartford Family Foundation was established in the State of New Jersey to preserve "the memory of the late George Huntington Hartford and the company he founded in 1859."

Investments 
The foundation solicits no new donations, and invests the assets that it has not yet distributed to maximize the return on investment. Unsolicited donations or estate gifts are deposited into the foundation's core accounts, while larger donations are earmarked and targeted for projects mutually agreeable to the foundation and the donor(s).

Awards and honors 
The foundation's grantees are often recognized with prestigious awards and honors—including multiple MacArthur Fellow ("genius") grants The foundation itself has won recognition; for example, in 2011 the foundation received the Community College of Philadelphia's Foundation Keystone Award for its work on the needs of older adults in community college nursing programs.

Criticism 
The foundation's genesis as an offspring of the A&P supermarket fortune, and its consequent stockholding ties with the A&P during the chain's marketplace decline in the 1960s and '70s, proved almost disastrous to the solvency of the foundation. At several points grantmaking was placed on hiatus. In 1969 the foundation attracted attention of the U.S. House Ways and Means Committee during hearings about the tax treatment of foundations with substantial financial links to corporations. Huntington Hartford, John and George Hartford's nephew and never a part of the foundation's governance structure, was highly critical of this lingering financial relationship. A period of A&P stock divestiture ensued and the foundation returned to financial stability by the late 1970s.

See also
 The Great Atlantic & Pacific Tea Company
 George Huntington Hartford
 George Ludlum Hartford
 John Augustine Hartford
 Huntington Hartford

References

External links 
 The John A. Hartford Foundation
 The Great Atlantic & Pacific Tea Company
 The Hartford Family Foundation

1929 establishments in New York (state)
Biomedical research foundations
Medical and health foundations in the United States
Non-profit organizations based in New York City
Organizations established in 1929
The Great Atlantic & Pacific Tea Company